Mankin is an unincorporated community in Henderson County, located in the U.S. state of Texas.

Geography
The community lies nearby the western front of the Cedar Creek Reservoir, on the Texas State Highway 274, between the cities of Tool and Trinidad. It has a cemetery and a church in the east.

References

Unincorporated communities in Henderson County, Texas
Unincorporated communities in Texas